Nicole Dixon (born 3 February 1995) is a Jamaican netball player. She was part of the Jamaican squad that won bronze at the 2018 Commonwealth Games and was an unused reserve member (not a part of the official squad) of the 2014 team.

In 2017, Dixon was temporarily suspended from the national team, along with fellow players Shanice Beckford and Khadijah Williams, due to a team training incident.

References

1995 births
Living people
Jamaican netball players
Place of birth missing (living people)
Netball players at the 2018 Commonwealth Games
Commonwealth Games bronze medallists for Jamaica
Commonwealth Games medallists in netball
2019 Netball World Cup players
Team Northumbria netball players
Netball Superleague players
Jamaican expatriate netball people in England
Medallists at the 2018 Commonwealth Games